The following is a timeline of the history of the city of Columbus, Georgia, US.

19th century

 1828
 Columbus settled on site of formerly Creek village.
 Mirabeau B. Lamar begins publication of the Columbus Enquirer newspaper.  
 Methodist Church established.
 Old City Cemetery founded.
 1829 - Baptist Church established.
 1830 - Population: 1,152.
 1834 - Columbus Factory (textiles) in business.
 1836 - Columbus becomes "center of military operations" against the Creek during the Creek War of 1836, fought nearby.
 1840 - Wynnton School built (approximate date).
 1846 - Fire.
 1847 - Columbus Board of Trade founded.
 1850
 Columbus Times newspaper begins publication.
 Population: 5,042. 
 1853
 Mobile & Girard Railroad begins operating.
 Columbus Iron Works built.
 Columbus Georgia Convention & Trade Center built.
 1854 - Temple Israel founded.
 1856 - Pemberton House built.
 1860 - Population: 9,621.
 1865 - April 16: Battle of Columbus; Union forces win.
 1867 - Rankin House built.
 1868 - Eagle & Phenix Mill in operation.
 1869 - Muscogee Mills in business.
 1870
 Bethel Baptist Church built (approximate date).
 Population: 7,401. 
 1871
 Springer Opera House opens.
 Lummus Cotton Gin manufactory relocates to Columbus.
 1879 - Confederate Monument erected.
 1880 - Population: 10,123.
 1886
 Columbus Evening Ledger newspaper begins publication.
 Future singer Ma Rainey born in Columbus.
 1887
 Columbus Messenger newspaper begins publication.
 Synagogue dedicated.
 1890 - Population: 17,303.
 1900 - Population: 17,614.

20th century

 1902 - Columbian Lodge No.7 Free and Accepted Masons building built.
 1905
 "Academic trade school" established.
 Cole-Hampton-Hatcher Grocery introduces flavored beverage Royal Crown Ginger Ale.
 1910 - Population: 20,554.
 1914 - Grand Theatre built.
 1918
 U.S. military Camp Benning established near Columbus.
 Textile labor unrest.
 National Association for the Advancement of Colored People Columbus branch organized (approximate date).
 1920 - League of Women Voters of Columbus organized.
 1921 - Centennial Cotton Gin Company relocates to Columbus.
 1925 - Tom Huston Peanut and Candy Co. in business.
 1926 - Lake Harding reservoir created on the Chattahoochee River near Columbus.
 1928
 WRBL radio begins broadcasting.
 Muscogee County Courthouse built.
 1929 - Social Civic 25 Club organized.
 1930 - Spencer High School, the first African American high school in Columbus.
 1936 - Junior League of Columbus established.
 1940
 Bradley Theatre opens.
 Population: 53,280.
 1949 - Columbus Symphony Orchestra active.
 1950
 Columbus Metropolitan Airport begins operating.
 Columbus Drive-In cinema in business.
 1953
 WRBL-TV and WTVM (television) begin broadcasting.
 Columbus Museum of Arts and Crafts opens.
 1958 - Columbus College established.
 1962 - National Civil War Naval Museum opened.
 1960 - Population: 116,779.
 1965 - B. Ed Johnson becomes mayor.
 1966 - Historic Columbus Foundation formed.
 1970 - Population: 154,168.
 1971
 Columbus joins with Muscogee County to form a consolidated city-county.
 Racial unrest.
 1972 - Metro Columbus Urban League established.
 1975 - Historic District Preservation Society organized.
 1976 - Chattahoochee Promenade built.
 1979 - Columbus' only Interstate highway, auxiliary Interstate-185 fully opened connecting Columbus to mainline Interstate-85, Atlanta.
 1980 - Population: 169,441.
 1983 - Richard Ray becomes U.S. representative for Georgia's 3rd congressional district.
 1988 - Columbus Ledger-Enquirer newspaper in publication.
 1990 - Population: 178,681.
 1993 - Sanford Bishop becomes U.S. representative for Georgia's 2nd congressional district.
 1996
 First ever Olympic Softball competition held at South Commons complex July 21–30.
 Columbus Civic Center (arena) opens.
 City website online (approximate date).

21st century

 2009 - National Infantry Museum founded.
 2010 - Population: 189,885.
 2011 - Teresa Tomlinson becomes mayor.

See also
 Columbus, Georgia history
 List of mayors of Columbus, Georgia
 National Register of Historic Places listings in Muscogee County, Georgia
 Timelines of other cities in Georgia: Athens, Atlanta, Augusta, Macon, Savannah

References

Bibliography

External links

 
 
 Items related to Columbus, various dates (via Digital Public Library of America).
 

Years in Georgia (U.S. state)
 
Columbus, Georgia